Dhibin (also spelled Dhaybin or Thibin) is a village in southern Syria, administratively part of the Salkhad District of the al-Suwayda Governorate. It is located south of al-Suwayda, near the southern border with Jordan. Nearby localities include Bakka to the north, Salkhad to the northeast, Umm al-Rumman to the east, Samaj to the west and Samad to the northwest. In the 2004 census it had a population of 2,562. It is the administrative center of the Dhibin Nahiyah, which consisted of three villages with a collective population of 6,900 in 2004.

History
Dhibin was a mainly grain-growing village in the late 16th century, during Ottoman rule. In the Ottoman tax registers of 1596, it was a village located the nahiya (subdistrict) of Butayna, in the  Qadaa of Hauran. It had a population of twelve households and four bachelors, all Muslims. They paid a fixed tax-rate of 25% on agricultural products, including wheat, barley, summer crops, goats and beehives, in addition to occasional revenues; a total of 1,000 akçe.

By the early 19th century, the village had been abandoned like many of the other villages of Jabal Hauran due to Bedouin depredations. Druze migrants from other parts of Syria populated the villages of Jabal Hauran by the 1860s. Dhibin became part of the sheikhdom of the Bani al-Atrash clan under the leadership of Ismail al-Atrash between 1860 and 1867. The inhabitants of Dhibin moved to annex and seasonally inhabit the village of Umm el-Jimal (in modern-day Jordan) in 1909. Dhibin's families divided the ruins of its ancient houses among themselves in 1910. They lived there on and off until around 1930, when they permanently abandoned Umm al-Jimal. Dhibin was the birthplace of Salim Hatum, a Syrian Army officer and key participant in the Baathist-led 1966 Syrian coup d'état.

Archaeology
Funerary material from the Middle Bronze Age has been found at Dhibin. A mid-4th-century inscription on a ruined building recording the name of Roman emperor Valentinian I has been found in the village as well.

References

Bibliography

External links 
 Map of the town, Google Maps

19th-century establishments in the Ottoman Empire
Archaeological sites in as-Suwayda Governorate
Druze communities in Syria
Populated places in Salkhad District